Nominal terms may refer to:
Nominal terms (computer science)
Real versus nominal value (economics)